The 1890 Amherst football team was an American football team that represented the Amherst College as a member of the Eastern Intercollegiate Football Association (EIFA) during the 1890 college football season. The team compiled an overall record of 7–6–1 with a mark of 3–1 in EIFA play. Amherst was outscored by a total of 185 to 184 on the season. Two of Amherst's losses were to undefeated national champion Harvard. Excluding the two one-sided losses to Harvard, Amherst outscored its opponents, 178 to 47. The team played its home games at Blake Field in Amherst, Massachusetts.

Schedule

References

Amherst
Amherst Mammoths football seasons
Amherst football